Sutezolid (PNU-100480, PF-02341272) is an oxazolidinone antibiotic currently in development as a treatment for extensively drug-resistant tuberculosis.
It differs from linezolid by replacement of the morpholine oxygen with a sulfur atom.

Notes
Rapid evaluation in whole blood culture of regimens for XDR-TB containing PNU-100480 (sutezolid), TMC207, PA-824, SQ109, and pyrazinamide

Fluoroarenes
Oxazolidinone antibiotics
Thiomorpholines